Roy Mason, Baron Mason of Barnsley,  (18 April 1924 – 19 April 2015), was a British Labour Party politician and Cabinet minister who was Secretary of State for Defence and Secretary of State for Northern Ireland in the 1970s.

Early life
He was born in Royston, West Riding of Yorkshire, on 18 April 1924, and grew up in Carlton, Barnsley, also in the West Riding of Yorkshire. Mason first went down the mines at the age of fourteen and he became a branch official of the National Union of Mineworkers (NUM) in his early twenties.  Aged 26, he studied at the London School of Economics as a mature student on a Trades Union Congress (TUC) scholarship. He remained in the coal industry until he was elected as Member of Parliament (MP) for the Barnsley constituency at a by-election in 1953.

Posts
Mason was Labour Party spokesman on Home Affairs, Defence and the Post Office, 1960–1964.  Minister of State at the Board of Trade, 1964–1967.  Minister of Defence (Equipment), 1967–1968.  Minister of Power, 1968–1969.  President of the Board of Trade, 1969–1970.  Secretary of State for Defence, 1974–1976. Secretary of State for Northern Ireland, 1976–1979

Northern Ireland
A high-profile politician, Mason's appointment to Northern Ireland was unexpected and seemed to indicate a tougher response from the British Government than had been pursued by his predecessor, Merlyn Rees. In late 1976, he told the Labour Party conference that "Ulster had had enough of initiatives, White Papers and legislation for the time being, and now needed to be governed firmly and fairly". He rejected both military and political solutions in favour of "justice for all; with equality before the law; and, crucially, with republican terrorism treated as a security problem, and nothing else".

While Secretary of State for Defence, Mason had been responsible for the introduction of SAS units into the 'bandit country' of South Armagh. At Stormont Mason was responsible for the tougher role taken by the security forces and authorised an increase in British Army covert tactics with the SAS allowed to operate throughout Northern Ireland. Mason's time in Northern Ireland was characterised by a reduction in violence; "in 1976 there were 297 deaths in Northern Ireland; in the next three years the figures were 111, 80, 120. In 1977, he stood up to militant loyalists attempting to repeat their successful Ulster Workers Council strike tactic of 1974. The same year, he twice attempted to get some movement towards a political settlement from the local political parties. In March 1979, the Irish National Liberation Army planned to assassinate Mason, but the plan was aborted.

Mason's policies in Northern Ireland earned the ire of Irish nationalist MPs. That played a part in the March 1979 vote of no confidence, which the Labour government lost by one vote, precipitating the 1979 general election. The Nationalist MP Gerry Fitt abstained in the vote of no confidence and stated that he could not support a government with Mason as its Northern Ireland secretary.

After Labour's election defeat in 1979, Mason came under increasing pressure from some on the left in his constituency party and from Arthur Scargill but did not countenance joining the Social Democratic Party. Mason received full police protection over 30 years after leaving office. In 1982, Energy Secretary Nigel Lawson suggested to Margaret Thatcher that she should make Mason the next Coal Board chairman, but she refused by saying that Mason was "Not one of us". Instead, Ian MacGregor was appointed.

Later life
After his retirement from the House of Commons at the 1987 general election, he was created a life peer on 20 October 1987 taking the title Baron Mason of Barnsley, of Barnsley in South Yorkshire. Mason lived in the same semi-detached house with his wife Marjorie from their marriage until he was aged 84.

He died at Highgrove Nursing Home, Stanley Road, Barnsley, of cerebrovascular disease, one day after his 91st birthday, on 19 April 2015. He was survived by his wife and his two daughters.

References

External links 
 
 

|-

|-

|-

|-

|-

|-

Alumni of the London School of Economics
1924 births
English miners
British Secretaries of State
Deputy Lieutenants of South Yorkshire
Labour Party (UK) life peers
Labour Party (UK) MPs for English constituencies
2015 deaths
Members of the Privy Council of the United Kingdom
National Union of Mineworkers-sponsored MPs
People from Royston, South Yorkshire
Politics of Barnsley
Secretaries of State for Defence (UK)
Secretaries of State for Northern Ireland
People of The Troubles (Northern Ireland)
UK MPs 1951–1955
UK MPs 1955–1959
UK MPs 1959–1964
UK MPs 1964–1966
UK MPs 1966–1970
UK MPs 1970–1974
UK MPs 1974
UK MPs 1974–1979
UK MPs 1979–1983
UK MPs 1983–1987
United Kingdom Postmasters General
Presidents of the Board of Trade
Ministers in the Wilson governments, 1964–1970
Life peers created by Elizabeth II